Afeez Aremu Olalekan (born 3 October 1999) is a Nigerian professional footballer who plays as a midfielder for  club FC St. Pauli. He has also played for the Nigeria national under-20 team.

Career
Aremu was born in Ibadan, Nigeria. He made his league debut with Remo Stars F.C. at the age of 14 in 2013–14 Nigeria National Pro League season during their terrain in the Nigerian Second Division League. He has played for several Nigeria Premier League teams, such as Sharks F.C. from where he played against Sunshine Stars F.C. and this made Sunshine Stars sign him. He got stronger interest from Rivers United F.C. after he played against them during the first leg of 2015–16 Nigeria Premier League season and was signed during the mid season. He won the man of the match again towards two games to the end of 2015–16 Nigeria Premier League season when Rivers United played against Akwa United F.C. and this also made Akwa United sign him in the 2017 Nigeria Premier League season.

In August 2020, Aremu joined 2. Bundesliga side FC St. Pauli from Eliteserien club IK Start on a three-year contract. The transfer fee paid to IK Start was undisclosed.

Career statistics

References

External links
 

1999 births
Living people
Nigerian footballers
Nigeria under-20 international footballers
Nigeria international footballers
Nigeria Professional Football League players
Association football midfielders
Remo Stars F.C. players
Sharks F.C. players
Sunshine Stars F.C. players
Akwa United F.C. players
Rivers United F.C. players
IK Start players
FC St. Pauli players
Eliteserien players
Norwegian First Division players
2. Bundesliga players
Nigerian expatriate footballers
Expatriate footballers in Norway
Expatriate footballers in Germany
Nigerian expatriate sportspeople in Norway
Nigerian expatriate sportspeople in Germany
Yoruba sportspeople
Sportspeople from Ibadan